Frances Nunziata (born ) is a Canadian politician who has served as the speaker of Toronto City Council since December 1, 2010. Nunziata presently represents Ward 5 York South—Weston. 

She is the sister of former member of Parliament (MP) John Nunziata and aunt of Toronto District School Board Trustee Patrick Nunziata.

Background
An accounting clerk, she became head of the Harwood Ratepayers Association. She was first elected to office in 1985 as school board trustee for the City of York School Board.

Political career 

In 1985 she was elected as school board trustee for the City of York School Board. In 1988, she was elected to the York City Council, ousting incumbent Gary Bloor.

On city council, she was involved in the Fairbank Park affair as a whistleblower. Nunziata leaked material to the press illustrating irregularities in the process, leading to a police investigation of several local politicians. After he reportedly threatened her, Nunziata took councillor Nicolo Fortunato to court. Fortunato also filed charges against Nunziata.

In the 1994 election, Nunziata challenged incumbent York mayor Fergy Brown and was elected. As mayor, her main cause was an unsuccessful campaign to construct a subway line under Eglinton avenue.

Toronto City Council 
With the creation of the megacity in 1997, she was elected to Toronto city council. On city council, she mostly concerned herself with law and order issues, like advocating for the city to have the power to impound the vehicles of men caught soliciting street prostitutes.

On December 7, 2010, she was elected as Speaker of Toronto City Council.

In 2021, she stopped an effort by  councillor Kristyn Wong-Tam to get details on city expenditures and decision-making associated with the controversial clearing of park encampments for the homeless.

Discrimination Claims 
In 2010, George Berger, an executive assistant who worked for her in 2005 brought her before the Human Rights Tribunal of Ontario, claiming harassment and discrimination during his employment. Berger claims that he was targeted due to a disability. Nunziata’s lawyer argued that there was no discrimination on the basis of disability. Berger was asking for monetary compensation and an apology. 

While Nunziata’s alleged conduct toward him was found to be “clearly rude and demeaning”, the judge ruled that his disability and her conduct were not related. However, the Ontario’s human rights tribunal found the City of Toronto had violated his rights.

Committees & Boards 

 Audit Committee
 Budget Committee
 Civic Appointments Committee
 Collective Bargaining Subcommittee
 Etobicoke York Community Council
 General Government and Licensing Committee
 George Bell Arena Board
 Planning and Housing Committee
 Striking Committee
 Toronto Community Housing Corporation
 Toronto Police Services Board

Nunziata also serves on the Weston Village BIA, the Mount Dennis BIA, Rockcliffe-Smythe NAP, York South-Weston NAP, Weston Village Residents Association, the Syme 55+ Centre Board of Directors and the George Bell Arena Board of Management.

Electoral record

References

External links

 

Canadian people of Italian descent
Mayors of York, Ontario
Toronto city councillors
Metropolitan Toronto councillors
Women mayors of places in Ontario
Living people
Women municipal councillors in Canada
Year of birth missing (living people)